Col du Mollendruz (el. 1180 m.) is a high mountain pass in the Jura Mountains in the canton of Vaud in Switzerland.

It connects L'Isle and Les Charbonnières.

See also

 List of highest paved roads in Europe
 List of mountain passes
List of the highest Swiss passes

Mollendruz
Mollendruz
Mountain passes of the canton of Vaud